CFJO-FM (branded as O97,3) is a French language Canadian radio station in Thetford Mines, Quebec, which broadcasts on 97.3 FM with an effective radiated power of 100,000 watts. Its motto is "Le Meilleur de la musique", which means "The Best of Music".

The station has studios in both Thetford Mines and Victoriaville, sharing facilities with its soft adult contemporary sister stations CKLD-FM and CFDA-FM. Both cities are served by the same transmitter, and both studios produce part of the station's broadcast schedule — however, Thetford Mines is considered the station's primary city of license.

History
The station first received CRTC approval in 1988. It was launched on 103.3 FM on July 15, 1989  by media mogul François Labbé, who already owned many radio stations consolidated as the Réseau des Appalaches. It moved to its current 97.3 frequency in 1997.

The first song played on the radio for the year 2000 was "Video Killed the Radio Star" by the Buggles.

In April 2014, Montreal-based Attraction Radio announced plans to acquire all of Réseau des Appalaches' stations, including CFJO-FM; the decision is currently awaiting CRTC approval.

Rebroadcasters

References

External links
 O97,3
 
 

Fjo
Fjo
Fjo
Fjo
Thetford Mines
Victoriaville
Radio stations established in 1989
1989 establishments in Quebec